Merrill F. Nelson (born July 16, 1955 in Tooele, Utah) is an American politician and a Republican member of the Utah House of Representatives representing District 68 since January 1, 2013. Merrill announced he was not seeking re-election in 2022.

Early life and career
Nelson was born in Grantsville, UT. He was the fourth child of eight children of Ruth Nelson (née Francom) and Russell A Nelson. His mother was born in Payson, UT; his father in Tooele, UT. When Merrill was born, his father was a farmer.

Nelson earned his BS in agricultural economics from Brigham Young University and his JD from J. Reuben Clark Law School. He has worked as a Supreme Court Law Clerk from 1982–83 and on the Supreme Court Advisory Committee on Appellate Procedure from 1986-87. Nelson is a member of the Utah State Bar. He is also a member of the American Professional Society on the Abuse of Children. Nelson chairs the Guardian ad Litem Oversight Committee, and has also worked on the Fair Boundaries Coalition since 2011. He also serves as chair of the Grantsville Old Folks Sociable.

Political career and elections
During the 2022 legislative session, Nelson served on the Infrastructure and General Government Appropriations Subcommittee, House Health and Human Services Committee, and House Transportation Committee.

In 2020, Nelson won 75.3% of the vote and won election once again to the Utah of House of Representatives.
In 2018, Nelson defeated Merle Wall, Kirk Pearson, Denyse Housley Cox, and Warren Rogers with 71.4% of the vote in the general election for Utah House of Representatives District 68 on November 6.
In 2016, Nelson won 70.81% of the vote in the Utah House of Representatives District 68 general election.
In 2014, Nelson was unopposed for the Republican convention and won the November 4, 2014 general election due to being unopposed because Independent candidate Rett Rowley was disqualified before the election.
2012 Nelson was selected from four candidates by the Republican convention to challenge District 68 incumbent Republican Representative Bill Wright in the June 26, 2012 Republican primary, winning with 1,910 votes (52.3%) and won the three-way November 6, 2012 General election with 9,831 votes (73.8%) against Democratic nominee Thomas Nedreberg and Constitution candidate Paul McCollaum, Jr.

 
1998 To challenge Senate District 13 incumbent Democratic Representative George Mantes, Nelson won the 1998 Republican primary, but lost the November 3, 1998 General election by 45 votes to Democratic nominee Ron Allen who had won the Democratic Primary against Senator Mantes. Allen served in the seat from 1999 until 2006.

Notable legislation
2022- Representative Nelson ran HB 143 which increases the penalty for a second driving under the influence conviction to a class a misdemeanor under certain circumstances.
2022- Representative Nelson ran HB 344 which, among other things, creates a medical candor process where a health care provider may investigate an injury, or suspected injury, associated with a health care process and may communicate information about the investigation to the patient and any representative of the patient.

2022 sponsored legislation

Kirton McConkie Pedophilia Scandal 
Nelson worked for law firm Kirton McConkie which represents the Church of Jesus Christ of Latter-day Saints based out of Salt Lake City, Utah. In this capacity, one of his duties was receiving phone calls from ecclesiastical leaders through a helpline to give legal advice regarding sensitive situations. Many of these phone calls to the helpline are made by Bishops of the LDS faith looking for legal advice around domestic violence and abuse reported to them through confessions of members in their Ward or local community. Nelson has been named in at least two cases of giving the legal advice to Bishops not to report sexual abuse of children to law enforcement or child protective services, and in both cases allowed the abuse to continue for years.

References

External links
Official page at the Utah State Legislature
Campaign site
Merrill Nelson at Ballotpedia
Merrill Nelson at the National Institute on Money in State Politics

1955 births
Living people
Brigham Young University alumni
J. Reuben Clark Law School alumni
Republican Party members of the Utah House of Representatives
People from Tooele, Utah
Utah lawyers
21st-century American politicians
People from Grantsville, Utah